Paige Toon was born in 1975 and grew up in Australia, America and England following her father's career as a race car driver meant she grew up all over the world. Paige worked at Heat magazine for eight years as Reviews Editor, but left to have a baby. She is now a full-time author and freelance journalist and lives in Cambridge with her husband Greg, an architect, son Indy and daughter Idha.

She has eleven novels to her name in the romance genre, three young adult novels (the Jessie Jefferson series) and two e-novellas. Her most recent novel 'Five Years From Now' was released in April 2018.

References

External links
 A CHRISTMAS WEDDING
 One Perfect Summer
 All books

1975 births
Living people
English romantic fiction writers
British chick lit writers